The 2013–14 Vanderbilt Commodores women's basketball team will represent Vanderbilt University in the 2013–14 college basketball season. The team's head coach is Melanie Balcomb, in her twelfth season at Vanderbilt. The team plays their home games at Memorial Gymnasium in Nashville, Tennessee, as a member of the Southeastern Conference.

Roster

Schedule

|-
!colspan=12| Exhibition

|-
!colspan=12| Non-conference regular season

|-
!colspan=12| SEC Regular Season

|-
!colspan=12| 2014 SEC tournament

|-
| colspan="12" | *Non-conference game. Rankings from AP poll. All times are in Central Time.
|}

Rankings

References

See also
2013–14 Vanderbilt Commodores men's basketball team

Vanderbilt
Vanderbilt Commodores women's basketball seasons
Vanderbilt